There are more than one hundred surviving North American B-25 Mitchells scattered over the world, mainly in the United States. Most of them are on static display in museums, but about 45 are still airworthy.

A significant number of these were brought together for Catch-22, a 1970 war film adapted from the book of the same name by Joseph Heller. When Catch-22 began preliminary production, Paramount hired the Tallmantz Aviation organization to obtain available B-25s. Tallmantz president, Frank G. Tallman ended up finding war-surplus aircraft, and eventually gathered not only pilots to fly the aircraft but also a ground support crew to maintain the fleet.

On 18 April 2010, 17 airworthy B-25s took off from the airfield behind the National Museum of the United States Air Force and flew over in formation to commemorate the 68th anniversary of the Doolittle Raid. Four of the surviving members of the Raid were in attendance for the reunion; Cole, Griffin, Hite, and Thatcher, although Hite departed before the flyover. Secretary of the Air Force Michael Donley; Commander of Air Force Materiel Command General Donald J. Hoffman; and the Director of the National Museum of the United States Air Force Major General (ret.) Charles Metcalf were there also.

In September 2005, a B-25C Mitchell that crashed in 1943 during a training exercise was raised from the depths of Lake Murray, SC. Bob Seigler who spearheaded the project, John Hodge and Bill Vartorella, formed the Lake Murray B-25 Rescue Project to salvage the aircraft from the bottom of Lake Murray. After recovery, the remains of the aircraft were moved to the Southern Museum of Flight in Birmingham, Alabama for conservation and museum display. A video crew, including maritime video experts Nautilus Productions Rick Allen (2nd camera & underwater camera) and Ric Hase (sound), documented the recovery for the Mega Movers series on the History Channel.

B-25 survivors

Argentina
Under restoration
B-25J
44-31173 – under restoration to flightworthiness by Gustavo M. Passano and his team.

Australia
On display
B-25D
41-30222 Hawg-Mouth – Darwin Aviation Museum in Winnellie, Northern Territory.
Under restoration or in storage
B-25C
41-12913 - partially stored at Darwin Aviation Museum in Winnellie, Northern Territory.
41-12924 - partially stored at Darwin Aviation Museum in Winnellie, Northern Territory.
B-25J
44-31508 – under restoration with Reevers Warbirds, Adelaide, South Australia, having been painted in markings of No. 18 (Netherlands East Indies) Squadron RAAF.

Austria
Airworthy
B-25J
44-86893 Red Bull – based in Salzburg, flown for the Flying Bulls/Red Bull and owned by Aircraft Guarantee Corp Trustee of Onalaska, Texas, USA.

Belgium
Under restoration
B-25J
44-30925 – under restoration to static display in WWII Stock condition by Belgian Aviation Preservation Association asbl.

Brazil
On display
B-25J
44-29500 – Museu Eduardo Andre Matarazzo, Bebedouro, Sao Paulo.
44-30069 – Museu Aerospacial in Campos dos Afonsos Air Force Base, Rio de Janeiro.
44-30245 – Praca das Velhas Aguias in Natal Air Force Base.

Canada
Airworthy
B-25J
45-8883 Hot Gen! (formerly Grumpy) – Canadian Warplane Heritage in Hamilton, Ontario.
On display
B-25J
44-30791 – Alberta Aviation Museum in Edmonton, Alberta. Ex-RCAF 5273, restored in 418 (City of Edmonton Squadron) markings as FW251 Daisy Mae.
44-86699 – Canada Aviation and Space Museum in Ottawa, Ontario.
44-86724 – CFB Winnipeg in Manitoba.
In Storage
B-25J
44-86726 – Reynolds-Alberta Museum in Wetaskiwin, Alberta.

Ecuador
On display
B-25J
44-86866 – Museo Aeronautico de la FAE Ecuadorian, Quito Air Force Base, partially restored and repainted in the famous "Apache Princess livery"

France
Crashed in 2011. Damaged beyond economical repair.
B-25J
45-8811 Russell's Raiders – at the Société de Développement et de Promotion de l'Aviation in La Ferté-Alais.

Indonesia

On display
B-25J
44-29022 / M-433 – Indonesian Air Force Academy Collection in Sleman Regency, Special Region of Yogyakarta.
44-29023 / M-434 – Gate guardian at Abdul Rachman Saleh Air Force Base in Malang, East Java.
44-29032 / M-443 – Dirgantara Mandala Museum in Adisutjipto Air Force Base, Special Region of Yogyakarta.
44-30399 / M-458 – Satriamandala Museum in South Jakarta, Jakarta.

Mexico
On display
B-25J
44-29128 – Museum of Technology in Mexico City.
Under Restoration
B-25J
44-29145 – San Juan de Aragon Park in Mexico City.
44-30692 – San Juan de Aragon Park in Mexico City.

Netherlands
Airworthy
B-25J
44-29507 Sarinah.
On display
B-25D
41-30792 – Overloon War Museum in Overloon.
B-25J
44-31258 – Militaire Luchtvaart Museum in Soesterberg.

Papua New Guinea
On display
B-25C
41-12442 – Aitape High School in Tadji.
41-12830 – Papua New Guinea National War Museum off the coast of Wanigela.

Russia
On display
B-25D
43-3355 – Moscow Air Force Museum.

Spain
On display
B-25J
44-29121 – Museo del Aire, Madrid.

United Kingdom
On display
B-25J
44-29366 – RAF Museum in Hendon.
44-31171 – American Air Museum in Duxford.

United States
Airworthy
B-25
40-2168 Miss Hap – based at the American Airpower Museum in Farmingdale, NY.  This aircraft was the fourth off the North American production line in 1940 and was designated an RB-25 (the "R" indicating restricted from combat, not a reconnaissance aircraft) and was assigned to General Henry H. "Hap" Arnold in 1943 and 1944.  It was later sold to Howard Hughes in 1951 and took Elizabeth Taylor to the funeral of her husband, Mike Todd.  Hughes sold the aircraft in 1961.
B-25D
43-3318 Grumpy – based at the Historic Flight Foundation in Spokane, Washington.
43-3634 Rosie's Reply (formerly Yankee Warrior) – Combat Veteran served with the 12th AF, 57th BW, 340th BG, 489th BS (8 combat missions). Based at the Yankee Air Museum in Ypsilanti, Michigan.  This aircraft has been recently repainted and remarked in its original squadron markings and as a flyable tribute to the women known as Rosie the Riveter.
B-25H
43-4106 Barbie III – based at the Cavanaugh Flight Museum in Addison, Texas.
43-4432 Berlin Express – based at EAA AirVenture Museum in Oshkosh, Wisconsin.
B-25J
43-27868 Yellow Rose – based at the Commemorative Air Force (Central Texas Wing) in San Marcos, Texas.
43-28059 Apache Princess – based at the Fantasy of Flight in Polk City, Florida.
43-28204 Pacific Princess – privately owned in Missoula, Montana.
43-35972 Maid in the Shade – based at the Commemorative Air Force (Airbase Arizona) in Mesa, Arizona.  This aircraft flew fifteen actual combat missions from Seraggia Airport on the island of Corsica in November and December 1944 as Battle 18 with the distinctive blue tail and blue ring cowls she now displays.  She was later an aerial pest spray aircraft and arrived at the then Arizona Wing of the CAF and was in restoration for almost 29 years until her first flight in May 2009.
44-28866 Champaign Gal – based at the Champaign Aviation Museum in Urbana, Ohio.
44-28925 How Boot That – based at the Cavanaugh Flight Museum in Addison, Texas.
44-28932 Tondelayo (listed as B-25J but had been a TB-25N) – based at the Collings Foundation in Stow, Massachusetts, aircraft was based at the Foundation's maintenance plant at American Aero Services at New Smyrna Beach Airport in New Smyrna Beach, Florida, but in August 2013 the aircraft was moved to Nut Tree Airport in Solano County, California to aid the fundraising campaigns of the Jimmy Doolittle Air and Space Center by offering rides over the San Francisco Bay area.
44-28938 Old Glory – privately owned in Latham, New York. Being restored after non-fatal crash in Stockton, California on 19 September 2020.
44-29199 In The Mood – based at the National Museum of World War II Aviation in Colorado Springs, Colorado.
44-29465 Guardian of Freedom – based at the Lyon Air Museum in Santa Ana, California.
44-29869 Miss Mitchell – based at the Commemorative Air Force (Minnesota Wing) in South St. Paul, Minnesota.
44-29939 Briefing Time – based at the Mid-Atlantic Air Museum in Reading, Pennsylvania.
44-30129 Wild Cargo – based at the Military Aviation Museum in Virginia Beach, Virginia.
44-30254 (unnamed) – based at the Flying Heritage Collection in Everett, Washington.
44-30423 Photo Fanny – based at the Planes of Fame in Chino, California.  This airplane has appeared in numerous movies, e.g. Catch-22 and Forever Young.
44-30456 Russian Ta Get Ya – based at the Lewis Air Legends in San Antonio, Texas.
44-30606 Tootsie – privately owned in Carson City, Nevada.
44-30734 Panchito – based at the Delaware Aviation Museum in Georgetown, Delaware.
44-30748 Heavenly Body – based at the Erickson Aircraft Collection in Madras, Oregon.
44-30801 Executive Sweet – based at the American Aeronautical Foundation at Camarillo Airport, Camarillo, California.
44-30823 God and Country – based at Mid-American Flight Museum in Mount Pleasant, Texas.
44-30832 Buck U – privately owned in Philadelphia, Pennsylvania.
44-31385 Show Me – based at the Commemorative Air Force (Missouri Wing) in St. Charles, Missouri.
44-86697 Killer B – privately owned in Wilmington, Delaware.
44-86698 Paper Doll – based at the Fagen Fighters WWII Museum in Granite Falls, Minnesota.
44-86725 Super Rabbit – based at the Oklahoma Museum of Flying in Oklahoma City, Oklahoma.
44-86734 Special Delivery – based at the Lone Star Flight Museum in Houston, Texas.
44-86747 Mitch The Witch II – based at the Palm Springs Air Museum in Palm Springs, California.
44-86758 Devil Dog – based at the Commemorative Air Force (Devil Dog Squadron) at Georgetown Municipal Airport in Georgetown, Texas; restored as a PBJ-1J.
44-86777 Georgie's Gal – based at the Liberty Aviation Museum in Port Clinton, Ohio.
44-86785 Georgia Mae – privately owned in Troy, Alabama.
44-86791 (unnamed) – based at the Yanks Air Museum in Chino, California.
44-86797 Ol Grey Mare – based at the Lauridsen Aviation Museum in Buckeye, Arizona.
45-8835 Betty's Dream – based at the Dakota Territory Air Museum in Minot, North Dakota.
45-8884 Lady Luck – privately owned in Blaine, Minnesota.
45-8898 Yankee Doodle – based at the Tri-State Warbird Museum in Batavia, Ohio.
PBJ-1J
44-30988 USN BuNo. 35857 Semper Fi – based at the Commemorative Air Force (Southern California Wing) at Camarillo Airport in Camarillo, California. This aircraft is the only known existing original PBJ-1.

On display
B-25C
41-12634 - Southern Museum of Flight in Birmingham, Alabama.
B-25D
41-29784 Fertile Myrtle – Patriots Point Naval & Maritime Museum in Mt. Pleasant, South Carolina.
43-3308 (unnamed) – Freedom Museum in Pampa, Texas.  It is on loan from the USMC Museum in Quantico, Virginia.
43-3374 (unnamed) – National Museum of the United States Air Force at Wright-Patterson AFB in Dayton, Ohio.
B-25H
43-4899 (unnamed) – Air Zoo in Kalamazoo, Michigan.
43-4999 Dog Daize – New England Air Museum in Windsor Locks, Connecticut.
B-25J
43-4030 Blonde Bomber – South Dakota Air and Space Museum at Ellsworth AFB in South Dakota.
43-27712 The Spirit of Al Penn – Pima Air & Space Museum adjacent to Davis-Monthan AFB in Tucson, Arizona.
43-28222 (unnamed) – Hurlburt Field, Florida.
44-28834 Flo – Grand Forks AFB, North Dakota.
44-28875 (unnamed) – Goodfellow AFB, San Angelo, Texas.
44-29035 (unnamed) – National Naval Aviation Museum at NAS Pensacola in Pensacola, Florida; painted as a PBJ-1 of VMB-423.
44-29812 Safe Return – National World War II Museum in New Orleans, Louisiana.
44-29835 (unnamed) – Lackland AFB in San Antonio, Texas.
44-30077 Mouthy Mitchell – Pacific Aviation Museum at the former NAS Ford Island in Honolulu, Hawaii.
44-30243 (unnamed) – Pendelton Air Museum in Pendelton, Oregon.
44-30363 Desert Bloom – Strategic Air and Space Museum in Ashland, Nebraska. The museum also features a partial fuselage display of another B-25.
44-30444 (unnamed) – Milwaukee Mitchell International Airport in Milwaukee, Wisconsin.
44-30493 (unnamed) – Malmstrom AFB, Great Falls, Montana.
44-30535 Iron Laiden Maiden – Mid-America Air Museum in Liberal, Kansas.
44-30649 Poopsie – Maxwell AFB, Alabama.
44-30854 (unnamed) – Air Force Armament Museum at Eglin AFB in Fort Walton Beach, Florida. This aircraft, retired in 1960, was the last operational B-25 in the USAF inventory. 
44-31004 Mary Alice II – Battleship Memorial Park in Mobile, Alabama.
44-31032 Problem Child – March Field Air Museum at March ARB (former March AFB) in Riverside, California.  It is on loan from the Military Aircraft Restoration Corp in Chino, California.
44-86772 (unnamed) – Hill Aerospace Museum at Hill AFB, Utah.
44-86843 Passionette Paulette – Grissom Air Museum at Grissom ARB (former Grissom AFB) in Indiana.
44-86872 The Little King – Museum of Aviation at Robins AFB in Warner Robins, Georgia.

44-86880 (unnamed) – National Museum of the Pacific War in Fredericksburg, Texas.
44-86891 Lazy Daisy Mae – Castle Air Museum at the former Castle AFB in Atwater, California.

Under restoration or in storage
B-25B
40-2347 – fuselage in storage at Aero Trader in Ocotillo Wells, California.
B-25C
41-13251 – to flightworthiness by private owner in San Francisco, California.
41-13285 Skunkie – to flightworthiness or display status by South Carolina Historic Aviation Foundation in Columbia, South Carolina.
42-32354 – in storage at Aero Trader in Ocotillo Wells, California.  This aircraft was featured in the television series The Twilight Zone, in the September 1960 episode "King Nine Will Not Return".
B-25J
44-28938 Old Glory – crashed in September 2020 in Stockton, California. Under restoration with the Prescott Foundation in Latham, New York. 
44-29877 Carol Jean – in storage at the Paul Garber Facility of the National Air and Space Museum in Silver Hill, Maryland.
44-29943 – in storate by private owner in Borrego Springs, California.
44-30203 – for display by the Pacific Coast Air Museum in Santa Rosa, California.
44-30210 – to flightworthiness by private owner in Tulsa, Oklahoma.
44-30324 – to flightworthiness by private owner in San Martin, California.
44-30627 – in storage by private owner in Borrego Springs, California.
44-30733 Sandbar Mitchell – to flightworthiness by Warbirds of Glory Museum in Brighton, Michigan.
44-30756 – in storage by private owner in Borrego Springs, California.
44-30761 – in storage by private owner in Borrego Springs, California.
44-86715 – to flightworthiness by Westpac Restorations in Colorado Springs, Colorado.
44-86727 – for display as PBJ at Flying Leatherneck Aviation Museum at Marine Corps Air Station Miramar in California.
44-86844 – to flightworthiness by private owner in Virginia Beach, Virginia.
45-8887 Ah'm Available Too – in storage by private owner in Borrego Springs, California.
TB-25N
44-30635 Whiskey Pete – At Southern Museum of Flight, Birmingham, Alabama, likely undergoing restoration for display.  Formerly under restoration at Octave Chanute Aerospace Museum at the former Chanute AFB in Rantoul, Illinois.

Venezuela
On display
B-25J
43-28096 – Museo Aeronautico FAV in Maracay Air Force Base.
44-30631 – Teniente Vicente Landaeta Gil AB in Barquisimeto.

See also
 List of bomber aircraft
 List of military aircraft of the United States

Notes

External links

 Hi-res virtual tour of Collings' B-25J 'Tondelayo'
 Hi-res virtual tour of B-25H 'Barbie III'
 Hi-res virtual tour of B-25J 'Panchito'

North American B-25 Mitchell